Hernán Alcides Iribarren (born June 29, 1984) is a Venezuelan professional baseball former infielder and current coach. He played in Major League Baseball (MLB) for the Milwaukee Brewers and Cincinnati Reds.

Minor league career
Iribarren was first signed as an undrafted free agent by the Milwaukee Brewers on March 26, 2002. He began the  season with their Rookie League Arizona League Brewers, before advancing to their Class A Beloit Snappers.

On March 14, 2008, he was assigned the Brewers' Triple-A Nashville Sounds.

Iribarren has also played two seasons in the Dominican Summer League. After playing in 130 games, he has accumulated a .329 batting average, 4 home runs, 61 RBIs, and 24 stolen bases.

Major league career
After beginning the 2008 season in the minor leagues, Iribarren was recalled on April 10, 2008. The team planned to use him in the outfield as well as the infield.

On April 12, Iribarren got his first hit off Carlos Muñiz of the New York Mets, a single to shallow center. He returned to Nashville on April 18, and was later recalled to the Brewers on June 10, only to be returned to Triple-A on June 22. He was recalled again by the Brewers on July 31, 2009.

On March 13, 2010, Iribarren was claimed off waivers by the Texas Rangers. According to Matt Eddy of baseballamerica.com Iribarren became a free agent after the 2010 season ended.
http://www.baseballamerica.com/blog/prospects/?p=10522

On January 5, 2011 it was reported that Iribarren signed a minor league deal with the Rockies with an invite to spring training. He suffered a knee injury in spring training and missed the entire 2011 season. He elected free agency from the Cincinnati Reds organization on November 6, 2015 but shortly re-signed with them on another minor league contract.

On December 9, 2016, Iribarren signed another minor league contract with Cincinnati. He elected free agency on November 6, 2017. He resigned a minor league deal for the 2018 season. He elected free agency on November 3, 2018.

On March 22, 2019 re-signed to a minor league deal with the Reds. However, he did not appear in any games and was released in early June.

Coaching career
He had retired as an active player and signed on as bench coach for the Billings Mustangs of the Pioneer League for the 2019 season. Iribarren became the bench coach for the Dayton Dragons in 2020.

See also
 List of Major League Baseball players from Venezuela

References

External links

1984 births
Living people
Arizona League Brewers players
Beloit Snappers players
Brevard County Manatees players
Cardenales de Lara players
Cincinnati Reds players
Colorado Springs Sky Sox players
Huntsville Stars players
Louisville Bats players
Major League Baseball players from Venezuela
Major League Baseball second basemen
Milwaukee Brewers players
Minor league baseball coaches
Nashville Sounds players
Oklahoma City RedHawks players
Sportspeople from Barquisimeto
Venezuelan baseball coaches
Venezuelan expatriate baseball players in the United States
West Virginia Power players